Dorothea Macheiner (b. 21 March 1943 as Dorothea Hummelbrunner in Linz) is an Austrian writer.

Life
Dorothea Macheiner grew up in Steinbach am Attersee. She studied theology and German philology. Several travels led her to the Mediterranean, Sardinia and Tunisia. In 1979, she participated at the literature award Ingeborg-Bachmann-Wettbewerb in Klagenfurt. She lives in Salzburg and Vienna.

Dorothea Macheiner writes novels, essays, poetry, drama and radio plays. 

She is member of the writers' associations Grazer Autorenversammlung and
IG Autorinnen Autoren. She received several subsidies for literature from the Austrian government and the city of Salzburg.

Works
 Splitter, Baden bei Wien 1981
 Puppenspiele, Frankfurt am Main u. a. 1982
 Das Jahr der weisen Affen, Vienna 1988
 Sonnenskarabäus, Vienna 1993
 Nixenfall, Vienna 1996
 Yvonne, Vienna 2001
 Ravenna, Rom, Damaskus ..., Vienna 2004
 Stimmen, Gosau 2006

External links 
 
 Biography, Literaturhaus Salzburg
 Author's entry at the writers' association GAV
 Info on Dorothea Macheiner

Writers from Linz
1943 births
Living people
Austrian women writers